Tikhiy Don  is a Russian sleeper train connecting Rostov-on-Don and Moscow.

General

The Tikhiy Don runs from the Rostov-Glavny station in Rostov-on-Don to Kazansky Rail Station in Moscow. It started its first regular service in January 1966. The train banner is similar to the flag of Rostov Oblast.

Stations 
Novocherkassk
Shakhtnaya
Likhaya
Kamenskaya
Millerovo
Chertkovo
Rossosh
Liski
Voronezh
Gryazi
Michurinsk
Ryazan

Till June, 1st, 2009 the train Tikhiy Don carried out passenger transportations together with the train Ataman Platov named after Russian Cossack general Matvei Platov.

See also 
North Caucasus Railway
Rostov-on-Don
And Quiet Flows the Don

References

External links
Russian Rail Ways site

Named passenger trains of Russia
Rail transport in Moscow
Night trains of Russia
Railway services introduced in 1966
Rail transport in the Soviet Union